Solkadhi is a type of drink, an appetizer originating from the Indian subcontinent, usually eaten with rice or sometimes drunk after or along with the meals. Popular in the coastal regions of Goa, southern Maharashtra and northern Karnataka, it is made from coconut milk and dried kokum skins, whose anthocyanin pigments provide a deep purple-pink colour.

Preparation
Solkadhi is prepared with the liquid extract of fresh coconut known as coconut milk. It is usually mixed with agal or kokum, a little bit of salt, and chili-garlic paste for taste and probiotic contents.

See also
 List of Indian beverages

References

External links

 Sol Kadhi Recipe
 Benefits of Solkadhi

Konkani cuisine
Goan cuisine
Indian drinks
Vegan cuisine